Germanium dichloride is a chemical compound of germanium and chlorine with the formula . It is a yellow solid.  Germanium dichloride is an example of a compound featuring germanium in the +2 oxidation state.

Preparation
Solid germanium dichloride can be produced by comproportionation by passing germanium tetrachloride, over germanium metal at 300 °C and reduced pressure (0.1 mmHg).

Germanium dichloride is also formed from the decomposition of trichlorogermane, at 70 °C. Trichlorogermane is generated when germanium reacts with hydrogen chloride. This reaction involves dehydrohalogenation.

Another route to germanium dichloride is the reduction of germanium tetrachloride with hydrogen at 800 °C.

Reactions
 is hydrolysed to give yellow germanium(II) hydroxide, which on warming gives brown germanium monoxide:

Alkalizing a solution containing germanium(II) ions:

Germanium oxides and hydroxides are amphoteric.
With chloride ion, ionic compounds containing the pyramidal  ion have been characterised, for example  With rubidium and caesium chloride compounds, e.g.  are produced; these have distorted perovskite structures.

Germanium dichloride reacts with tetraethylammonium chloride to give the trichlorogermanate:

Dichlorogermylene
Molecular  is often called dichlorogermylene, highlighting its resemblance to a carbene. The structure of gas-phase molecular  shows that it is a bent molecule, as predicted by VSEPR theory. Usually, germanium dichloride is generated from germanium dichloride dioxane.

References

Germanium(II) compounds
Chlorides
Metal halides
Nonmetal halides